Ishmael Reginald Butler (born July 3, 1969) is an American rapper, record producer and songwriter.  He is best known for his work with such groups as Digable Planets in the 1990s and Shabazz Palaces in the 2010s.

Early life
Butler, who is a native of Seattle, was born in 1969. His father was a history professor at the University of Virginia. He first forayed into music by playing the alto saxophone in his middle school jazz band. In 1987, he graduated from Garfield High School and moved to Massachusetts to enroll in college.

Career
In 1989, Butler dropped out of college and moved to Brooklyn, where he recorded a demo of hip hop tracks, which was eventually delivered to the Pendulum Records executive Ruben Rodriguez. In 1992, Butler auditioned to Pendulum Records with his friends Craig Irving, from Philadelphia, and Mary Ann Vieira, from Washington, D.C, forming Digable Planets. Digable Planets' 1992 single "Rebirth of Slick (Cool Like Dat)" achieved commercial and critical success, charting on Billboard Hot 100. Known for merging hip hop with jazz and philosophical lyrics, the group released two albums before disbanding in the mid-1990s. Following Digable Planets' demise, Butler recorded music under the alias Cherrywine and took film classes at New York University. In 2003, he returned to Seattle to take care of his mother.

In 2009, Butler formed Shabazz Palaces with his neighbor Tendai Maraire. After self-releasing two EPs, the duo signed to Sub Pop Records, releasing their debut album, Black Up, in 2011. Its follow-up, Lese Majesty, was released in 2014.

Butler also became a member of Sub Pop’s A&R team in 2013.

Personal life
Butler has a son named Jazz Ishmael Butler, known professionally as Lil Tracy, from a previous relationship with Coko Gamble, the lead singer of SWV.

Discography

References

External links

Living people
American hip hop musicians
African-American rappers
Five percenters
Rappers from Seattle
21st-century American rappers
1969 births
21st-century African-American musicians
20th-century African-American people